Panther Run is a tributary of North Branch Buffalo Creek in Centre County and Union County, Pennsylvania, in the United States. The stream's headwaters are in a forest spring and it has one named tributary. Virtually all of the watershed is forested. In addition to hardwood forests and white pine, rhododendrons, sedges, grasses, and clubmosses occur in the stream's vicinity.

Course

Panther Run begins in a valley in Haines Township, Centre County. It flows east-northeast for a few tenths of a mile before entering Hartley Township, Union County. Here, the stream continues to flow east-northeast for a few miles. It then begins flowing southeast past Buck Ridge. The stream then enters The Hook, where it receives Slide Hollow, its only named tributary, from the left. It then turns southwest for a few tenths of a mile before reaching its confluence with North Branch Buffalo Creek across from Dogback Mountain.

Tributaries
Panther Run has one named tributary, which is known as Slide Hollow.

Geography and geology

The headwaters of Panther Run are in a spring on the forest floor. The stream is a "sizable stream" in some reaches. However, it is considerably smaller than North Branch Buffalo Creek, which it is a tributary of.

Watershed

The stream is entirely within the United States Geological Survey quadrangle of Hartleton. The watershed makes up approximately 2 percent of the Buffalo Creek drainage basin.

About 100 percent of the watershed of Panther Run is on forested land.

History and recreation
Panther Run was entered into the Geographic Names Information System on August 2, 1979. Its identifier in the Geographic Names Information System is 1183261.

In a 2008 report, the watershed of Panther Run was ranked eighth amongst sub-watersheds in the Buffalo Creek drainage basin for restoration priority.

A hiking trail in The Hook Natural Area is located along Panther Run and also crosses the stream several times.

Biology
Wild trout naturally reproduce in Panther Run from its upper reaches downstream to its mouth. The stream's headwaters are designated as a Wilderness Trout Stream.

In the upper reaches, Panther Run's streambanks are flanked by hardwood forest. Eventually, this gives way to white pine and various sedges and grasses. In other reaches, the understory along the stream is dominated by rhododendrons. Additionally, patches of a clubmoss known as Lycopodium annotinum occur close to it.

See also
Coal Run (North Branch Buffalo Creek), next tributary of North Branch Buffalo Creek going downstream
List of rivers of Pennsylvania

References

External links

Rivers of Centre County, Pennsylvania
Rivers of Union County, Pennsylvania
Tributaries of Buffalo Creek (West Branch Susquehanna River)
Rivers of Pennsylvania